Csákvár is a town in Fejér county, Hungary.

See also 
 Csák family

References

External links

  in Hungarian
 Csákvár Fire Department
 Csákvári TK – Football club

Populated places in Fejér County
Esterházy family